Preserved EMUs of Southern Railway. This is a list of preserved Southern Railway (UK) designated electric multiple units (EMUs).

Glossary
For an explanation of type codes, such as DMBSO, see British Rail coach type codes.

2-BIL

2-EPB

Departmental Sandite Units 930205 and 930206 (ex-DMBSOs 65302/65304/65379/65382) relocated to MoD Bicester for storage after closure of Finmere Railway Station.

2-HAP

4-CEP 

The full list is shown below. Complete units are highlighted:

4-CIG 

The full list is shown below. Complete units are highlighted:

4-SUB

4-TC

4-COR

4-EPB

4-DD

4-REP

62482 is the last 4-REP in existence and is currently placed in storage in Nottingham. The 4REP appreciation society were looking at saving the remaining carriage and turning them back to a 4-REP.

4-VEP

Remaining unpreserved units/coaches

Preservation

5-BEL

The table below sets out the current position:

6-PUL

After withdrawal from passenger service, the underframes of several PUL and PAN unit carriages were reused by the engineering department as long-welded rail carriers and crane runners.

Former 6-PUL Pullman cars 264 Ruth and 278 Bertha have been preserved, and are now used as ordinary locomotive-hauled Pullman cars. Number 264 is part of the Venice Simplon Orient Express fleet, working charter trains on the main line, while 278 is on the Swanage Railway. Former 6-PUL Trailer Composite car, number 11773, was preserved on the Swanage Railway for many years, but fell into bad condition and has now been scrapped.

GLV

MLV

Waterloo & City Line

A single DMBSO of Class 487 stock, No. 61, used on the Waterloo & City line has been preserved at the London Transport Museum Depot in Acton.

References

External links 
 Hastings Diesels
 Network SouthEast Railway Society
 400Series.co.uk
 Southern Electric Group
 Woking Miniature Railway

Southern Railway (UK) electric multiple units
Rail transport preservation in the United Kingdom